Franco Acosta Machado (5 March 1996 – 6 March 2021) was a Uruguayan professional footballer who played as a striker.

Club career
Born in Montevideo, Acosta joined Centro Atlético Fénix's youth setup in 2009, aged 13. On 23 November 2013, he made his first team debut, coming on as a second-half substitute in a 1–0 home loss against Liverpool F.C. for the Primera División championship.

Acosta scored his first professional goal on 16 February 2014, netting the second in a 3–0 away win against Racing Club de Montevideo. On 1 July he agreed to a deal with S.C. Braga, but returned to Fénix in September.

Acosta was eventually included in the main squad and appeared in eight matches, scoring once. On 19 January 2015, he signed a -year contract with Villarreal CF, being assigned to the reserves in Segunda División B.

On 15 January 2018, Acosta joined Segunda División B team Racing de Santander on loan until the end of the season. Acosta was then loaned out to Plaza Colonia for the 2019 season. He left Villarreal at the end of 2019 and remained without a club until 10 August 2020, when he signed with Atenas de San Carlos.

Death
On 6 March 2021, a day after his 25th birthday, Acosta disappeared after trying with his brother to swim across the Arroyo Pando, located in the Department of Canelones, Uruguay. Two days later, on 8 March 2021, his body was found, and was declared dead at the scene.

References

External links
Villarreal official profile 

1996 births
2021 deaths
Footballers from Montevideo
Uruguayan footballers
Association football forwards
Uruguayan Primera División players
Segunda División B players
Club Plaza Colonia de Deportes players
Centro Atlético Fénix players
Racing de Santander players
Villarreal CF B players
Atenas de San Carlos players
Uruguay youth international footballers
Uruguay under-20 international footballers
2015 South American Youth Football Championship players
Uruguayan expatriate footballers
Uruguayan expatriate sportspeople in Spain
Expatriate footballers in Spain